Prashant Awasthi (born 26 June 1990) is an Indian first-class cricketer who plays for Railways.

References

External links
 

1990 births
Living people
Indian cricketers
Railways cricketers
Cricketers from Uttar Pradesh